Stróża may refer to:

Stróża, Wołów County in Lower Silesian Voivodeship (south-west Poland)
Stróża, Wrocław County in Lower Silesian Voivodeship (south-west Poland)
Stróża, Lublin Voivodeship (east Poland)
Stróża, Łódź East County in Łódź Voivodeship (central Poland)
Stróża, Pajęczno County in Łódź Voivodeship (central Poland)
Stróża, Limanowa County in Lesser Poland Voivodeship (south Poland)
Stróża, Myślenice County in Lesser Poland Voivodeship (south Poland)
Stróża, Świętokrzyskie Voivodeship (south-central Poland)